Murdoch McRae (November 4, 1846 – March 9, 1909) was a merchant and political figure in Nova Scotia, Canada. He represented Richmond County in the Nova Scotia House of Assembly from 1871 to 1878 and from 1882 to 1886 as a Liberal-Conservative member.

He was born in Nest Bay, Richmond County, Nova Scotia, the son of Donald McRae, and educated there. In 1872, he married Mary Euphemia McDougall. McRae served as a member of the county council. He supported the development of a railroad for Cape Breton Island from Canso to Louisbourg. In 1886, he was employed by the federal Post Office Department. He died in St. Peter's, Nova Scotia.

References 
The Canadian parliamentary companion, 1883 JA Gemmill
 A Directory of the Members of the Legislative Assembly of Nova Scotia, 1758-1958, Public Archives of Nova Scotia (1958)

Progressive Conservative Association of Nova Scotia MLAs
1846 births
1909 deaths